The Women's team pursuit competition at the 2021 World Single Distances Speed Skating Championships was held on 12 February 2021.

Results
The race was started at 15:10.

References

Women's team pursuit
2021 in women's speed skating